The University of Kashmir (U-K, UoK), informally known as Kashmir University (KU), is a collegiate public state university located on the western side of Dal Lake in the city of Srinagar in Jammu and Kashmir, India which was established in 1948. The main campus of the university is divided into three parts; Hazratbal Campus, Naseem Bagh Campus, and Mirza Bagh Campus.

The university offers undergraduate, postgraduate and doctoral programs in the fields of liberal arts, business, commerce & management studies, education, law, applied sciences & Technology, biological sciences, physical & material sciences, social sciences, medicine, dentistry, engineering, oriental learning, and music & fine arts. It has been awarded Grade "A+" by the NAAC on 20 May 2019.

History

The inception of the University of Kashmir dates back to the establishment of Jammu and Kashmir University in 1948. Contribution of academicians of various faculties needs special mention. Notable alumni are spread around globe, have made a name for country and for the university. In 1969, it was made into two full-fledged universities: University of Kashmir at Srinagar and University of Jammu at Jammu.

The University of Kashmir, since its establishment, has been focused at Hazratbal and encompasses three adjacent areas: Amar Singh Bagh, Naseem Bagh and Mirza Bagh. It is the largest university by a number of full-time students in the union territory of Jammu and Kashmir.

A major part of Amar Singh Bagh and Naseem Bagh constitute the Hazratbal campus which is laid out on the northeastern bank of Dal Lake. Earlier, many postgraduate departments, research and other centres were housed in Naseem Bagh. But the university resolved to develop Naseem Bagh into a heritage site and, thereafter, many departments were shifted to other areas of the Hazratbal campus.  Zakura Campus is being developed on 300 kanals of land in close proximity to Hazratbal campus to meet expansion requirements of the university. Mirza Bagh or "University Town" constitutes buildings housing quarters for the university staff.

The idea of extending postgraduate programmes to colleges and establishing new campuses at Ananthnag and Baramulla was conceived by the then Vice Chancellor Prof Raees ahmad in 2002. He mobilised over 30 crores for the development of the university from the prime minister's fund for the overall development of the main campus and the establishment of the new campuses. The foundation stones were laid by Mufti Muhammad Sayeed and the plans of buildings were approved. The locations of the campuses had to be changed because of likely floods. After Prof Tareen the development of campuses took a long time and became operational in 2008/2009. The new social science block, the life science block, the examination block, the humanities block, the distance education block, the media block and many other buildings were constructed in 2001 and 2004 during Prof Tareen's period out of the PMs special fund. The 200-capacity convention centre was also completed.

The South Campus established on 259 kanals of land at Fateh Garh, Anantnag was started in October 2008. The North Campus on 559 kanals at Delina, Baramulla was started in December 2009. Three more campuses at Kupwara, Kargil and Leh are coming up.

Present form 
The University of Kashmir has flourished into one of the largest universities. There are 12 faculties, 47 academic departments, 21 centres, 36 colleges and six (privately managed) recognised institutes spread all over the state. The two largest departments in student enrolment include Faculty of Law and the Business School.

The Faculty of Law being one of the oldest departments runs three courses LLB, LLM and B.A, LLB(Hons). The Faculty of Law has been successfully pursuing higher standards of academic excellence. The department has produced eminent jurists, lawyers, authors, civil servants and politicians. The department's student body, "Law Society," actively organises debates, seminars, and moot court competitions. The faculty publishes a refereed research journal, Kashmir University Law Review (KULR), which is acclaimed across the country and appreciated by academia, eminent lawyers and judges.

The Business School has become an iconic institution in the field of management education and has been playing an incredible role in the growth of corporate sector and management education in India. Its Integrated MBA (IMBA) and Master of Tourism & Hospitality Management (MTHM) programmes are unique blends of strategic thinking, pragmatism in implementation and cutting-edge on relevance. The business school has been renamed as the Department of management studies Pre the naac vist that was held in 2019. It was changed because they added a some other courses as well and thus the name Department of management studies other than the business school. It is still called as the business school but on papers the name has changed

The courses offered by the department of Media Education Research Centre (MERC) in mass communication and journalism has been a boon for the youth of the valley. The centre has produced more than 800 postgraduates, about 80% of them are working with media organizations at local, national and international levels. The alumni of the centre are placed in reputed national broadcast journalism organizations like NDTV, CNN-IBN, Headlines Today, Sahara, Zee News, Times Now, Star News and national print media organizations like Times of India, Hindustan Times, Indian Express, The Hindu, Mail Today, Outlook, India Today, Tehelka, and The Week. The masters programme in Kashmir and South Asia Studies introduced at the UNESCO Madanjeet Singh Institute of Kashmir Studies from 2013 academic session under a reformulated MoU between South Asia Foundation (SAF), India and the University of Kashmir, Srinagar has seen students in the state and across the border showing keen interest in studying Kashmir from a multi-dimensional perspective. Other faculties have made remarkable achievements since its inception with students preferring to pursue higher education from this university. In 2014 the university started its engineering college – Institute of Technology at the newly acquired Zakura Campus. Currently, the college offers four-year BTech courses in Mechanical Engineering, Electronics and Communication Engineering and Electrical Engineering.

Campus
The university has 247 acres campus in Hazratbal. In order to make education more accessible to people living in remote areas of Kashmir valley, the university has established Satellite Campuses at Anantnag (South Campus), Zakura Campus (Institute of Technology), and Baramulla (North Campus). Three more Satellite Campuses at Kupwara, Kargil and Leh are being established.

Library
The university has a central library called Allama Iqbal Library. It has a collection of over 600,000 books including 415 rare manuscripts. It was established to cater the needs of scholars, researchers and students of the university. With the split of university in 1969, the library was shared by the two universities (University of Kashmir and University of Jammu).

Hostels

The university provides residential facilities on a first-come-first-served basis to the teaching and non-teaching staff as well as to students.
Gani Kashmiri Hostel for research scholars pursuing M.Phil. and PhD programmes
Habba Khatoon Girls Hostel for female students
Mehboob-ul-Aalam Hostel for postgraduates male students
Shiekh-ul-Aalam (A.R) Hostel for male students
Maulana Anwar Shah Kashmiri Hostel for male students

Affiliated colleges
The University of Kashmir has 45 affiliated and 21 constituent colleges.

Constituent colleges
Government Medical College, Srinagar
Government Medical College, Anantnag
Government Medical College, Baramulla
Government Dental College, Srinagar
Government College of Education, Srinagar
Institute of Music & Fine Arts, Srinagar
Government College of Physical Education, Ganderbal
DOEACC, Rangreth Srinagar
Composite Regional Centre

Permanently affiliated government colleges

Islamia College of Science and Commerce, Srinagar
Government College for Women, Anantnag
Government College for Women, Baramulla
Government College for Women, Nawakadal Srinagar
Government Degree College for Boys, Anantnag
Government College for Boys, Baramulla
Government Degree College, Bemina
Government Degree College, Kupwara
Government Degree College, Sogam lolab
Government Degree College, Handwara
Government Degree College, Sopore
Government Degree College, Pulwama
Government Degree College, Tral
Government Degree College, Shopian
Government Degree College, Ganderbal
Government Degree College, Kulgam
Government Degree College, Kelam
Government Degree College, Doru
Government Degree College, Pattan
Government Degree College, Beerwah
Government Degree College, Uri
Government Degree College, Bijbehara
Government Degree College, Budgam
Government Degree College, Bandipora
Government Degree College for Women, Sopore
Government Model Degree College Tangmarg Gulmarg
Vishwa Bharti Women's College, Srinagar
Government Degree College, Bomai Sopore

Organisation and administration

Faculties, departments, and centres
School of Arts, Languages and Literature

Department of Arabic
Department of Urdu
Department of English
Department of Kashmiri
Department of Foreign Languages
Department of Library and Information Science
Department of Linguistics
Department of Persian
Department of Sanskrit
Department of Hindi
School of Social Sciences
Department of Economics
Department of History
Department of Shah-i-Hamadan(A.R) Institute of Islamic Studies
Media Education Research Center (MERC)
Department of Political Science
Department of Sociology & Social Work
Department of Psychology
Department of Philosophy
Department of Library & Information Sciences (LIS)
Faculty of Business & Financial Studies & Management
Department of Business & Financial Studies (Erstwhile department of Commerce)
Department of Management Studies
Faculty of Education
Department of Education
Department of Physical Education
Faculty of Medicine
Faculty of Dentistry
School of Unani and Ayurvedic Medicine
Faculty of Engineering
Department of Electronics and Communication Engineering (Zakura Campus)
Department of Mechanical Engineering (Zakura Campus)
Department of Electrical Engineering (Zakura Campus)
Department of Computer Science and Engineering (North Campus, Delina Baramulla)
Faculty of Law
Department of Law
Faculty of Music & Fine Arts
Faculty of Oriental Learning
Faculty of Biological Sciences
Department of Botany
Department of Biochemistry
Department of Zoology
Department of Biotechnology
Department of Clinical Biochemistry
Faculty of Physical & Material Sciences
Department of Chemistry
Department of Geology & Geophysics
Department of Mathematics
Department of Physics
Department of Statistics
School of Earth and Environment Sciences
Department of Earth Sciences
Department of Environmental Science
Department of Geography & Regional Development
Department of Geoinformatics
Faculty of Applied Sciences & Technology
Electronics & Instrumentation Technology
Institute of Home Science
Pharmaceutical Science
Department of Computer Science
Department of Food Science & Technology
Department of Information Technology ( currently under IT&SS)
Centres
Directorate of Physical Education & Sports
Directorate of Distance Education
Directorate of Life Long Learning
Directorate of Information Technology & Support System (IT & SS)
Directorate of Internal Quality Assurance (DIQA)
Directorate of Watch & Ward
Directorate of Hygiene & Environment
Directorate of Convocation Complex
Centre of Central Asian Studies (CCAS)
Centre of Research for Development (CORD)
Centre for Energy Studies
Centre for Biodiversity & Taxonomy
University Science & Instrumentation Centre
Educational Multimedia Research Centre (EMMRC)
State Resource Centre (SRC)
Public Relations Centre (PRC)
Centre for Career Planning and Counselling(CCPC)
Population Research Centre (PRC)
Allama Iqbal(A.R) Institute of Culture & Philosophy
Institute of Music & Fine Arts
Regional Study Center

Faculty of Nursing

Academics
University of Kashmir offers 107 courses across 11 streams at undergraduate, postgraduate and doctoral level. Under undergraduate programme, the university offers three-year Bachelor of Arts, Bachelor of Commerce, Bachelor of Law and Bachelor of Science streams, four-year Bachelor of Technology and five-year integrated BA LLB courses in different specializations. Under postgraduate programme, the university offers two-year Master of Arts, Master of Business Administration, MBA-FM, Master of Social Work, Master of Commerce, Master of Technology, Master of Pharmacy and Master of Computer Applications courses. These courses are offered by different schools of specialisations which fall under their respective departments and faculties.

Scholarships

Merit scholarships
Students selected for admission to various courses/programmes in the university are eligible to receive two merit scholarships which are paid to the top two merit holders. Merit scholarship in favour of previous year paid students is granted on the basis of merit in the entrance test to the course. In the final year, it is awarded on the basis of merit in the M.A/ MSc/ M.Com./ MLIS Previous/ 1st & 2nd semester examination. The scholarship is granted from the date of admission to the course up to the last date of the examination, subject to a maximum period of 12 calendar months.

Research scholarships
There are six departmental scholarships in each Department/Research Centre awarded for research leading to the award of PhD/M.Phil. degrees in addition to contingency grant payable annually for meeting miscellaneous expenses. The amount of scholarship paid to each selected scholar is Rs 10000/= per month for the period of maximum three years.

Students aid
The university has adopted a scheme called "Student Aid Fund" under which financial assistance is extended to students, particularly the meritorious ones from low-income groups. The Kashmir University Alumni Association also provides financial assistance to students with poor economic backgrounds with preference given to students who are orphans.

Rankings

Internationally, the University of Kashmir was ranked 451–500 in Asia in the QS World University Rankings for 2023.
In India, the QS World University Rankings ranked the University of Kashmir 56-60 and the National Institutional Ranking Framework (NIRF) ranked it 78th overall. and 48th among universities in 2020.

Sports
The Directorate of Physical Education & Sports was established in the university in the year 1948 with the objective of promoting sports culture among the youth for the overall development of personality. Since then, it has hosted various inter-university tournaments in various sports like water skiing, kayaking, canoeing, surfing, sailing, and dragon boating at zonal and national levels. The university students have also earned laurels to the university in International Winter Sports Championships. Adventure sports like mountaineering and trekking have also been introduced. Several training camps are also organised in the university to train the students pursuing different courses.

The university has cricket, hockey, football, volleyball, handball, baseball, tennis, and basketball courts/fields and gyms within the main campus.

Notable alumni

Agha Shahid Ali, poet
Ayub Thakur
Bilal Nazki
Farooq Kathwari
Farooq Nazki
Ghulam Nabi Azad
Karan Singh
Mansoor Ahmad Mir
Mehbooba Mufti
Mirwaiz Umar Farooq
Saifuddin Soz
Syed Salahuddin
Sunanda Pushkar
Tarannum Riyaz
Z. G. Muhammad
Mohammad Yaqoob Mir
Malik Sajad
Davoud Danesh-Jafari, Iranian politician and economist, former was minister of economy and finance affairs of Iran

See also
University of Kashmir Convocation Complex
Central University of Kashmir
Cluster University of Srinagar
National Institute of Technology, Srinagar
Foreshore Road

References

External links

 
Educational institutions established in 1956
Universities in Jammu and Kashmir
University of Kashmir
Srinagar district
1956 establishments in Jammu and Kashmir